Postcards is the eighth album from Contemporary Christian music singer Cindy Morgan, her first for Reunion Records and her first with producer Wayne Kirkpatrick.

Track listing
All songs written by Cindy Morgan, except where noted.

 "Deep" (Wayne Kirkpatrick, Morgan) - 4:34
 "Enough" - 4:03
 "Postcards" - 3:48
 "Glory" (Kirkpatrick, Morgan) - 5:05
 "Where You Are" (Morgan, Andrew Ramsey) - 3:47
 "Mother" - 3:30
 "Oh What Love" - 4:22
 "Eternal Sunshine" (Matthew Gerrard, Morgan) - 4:05
 "Dig Up" (Kirkpatrick, Morgan) - 3:39
 "Come Home" (Kirkpatrick, Morgan) - 3:52
 "The River" - 3:32

Personnel
 Adapted from AllMusic:
 Cindy Morgan – lead vocals, harmony vocals (1, 2, 3, 7, 8), dulcimer (2), acoustic piano (3, 6, 7, 9, 11), backing vocals (4, 5, 8, 9)
 Wayne Kirkpatrick – acoustic guitar (1, 3-6, 8, 9, 10), kantele (1), Wurlitzer organ (1), backing vocals (2, 5, 9, 10), piano (4), manditar (4), drum programming (4), electric guitar (5), National guitar (5, 8, 9), pencil guitar (5), harmony vocals (7), melodica (10)
 Gordon Kennedy – electric guitar (1-6, 8, 9), 12-string guitar (1), sitar (1), backing vocals (2, 5), nylon guitar (6), high-strung acoustic guitar (8), rhythm electric guitar (9), ukelele (10)
 Jerry Douglas – Weissenborn guitar (7)
 Chris Donohue – bass (1-6, 8, 9), keyboards (2, 11), upright bass (7, 11), harmonium (7)
 Steve Brewster – drums (1-6, 8, 9), percussion (2, 4)
 Tom Howard – string arrangements (1, 2, 3)
 David Davidson – strings (1, 2, 3)
 Carole Rabinowitz-Neuen – strings (1, 2, 3)
 Pamela Sixfin – strings (1, 2, 3)
 Kristin Wilkinson – strings (1, 2, 3)
 Jonathan Yudkin – cello (8)

Production
 Producer – Wayne Kirkpatrick
 Executive Producer – Terry Hemmings
 A&R – Jason McArthur

References

2006 albums
Cindy Morgan (singer) albums
Reunion Records albums